Eva Bowring (née Kelly; January 9, 1892January 8, 1985) was a U.S. Senator from Nebraska. Bowring was born in Nevada, Missouri. In 1928, she married Arthur Bowring. They made their home at the Bowring Ranch near Merriman in Cherry County, Nebraska.

Bowring was active in Republican politics in Nebraska. She was appointed to the United States Senate by Governor Robert B. Crosby to fill the vacancy caused by the death of Dwight Griswold, making her the first woman to represent Nebraska in the Senate. She served from April 16, 1954, to November 7, 1954. Bowring was the fourth of six Senators to serve during the fifteenth Senate term for Nebraska's Class 2 seat, from January 3, 1949 to January 3, 1955.

After her service in the Senate, Bowring continued ranching near Merriman. She served part-time on the Board of Parole of the Department of Justice from 1956 to 1964. She died in 1985, only one day before her 93rd birthday. After her death, Bowring Ranch was donated to the Nebraska Game and Parks Commission, becoming Bowring Ranch State Historical Park.

See also 
 Women in the United States Senate

References

External links 

Bowring Ranch State Historical Park
 The Political Graveyard

1892 births
1985 deaths
Female United States senators
Nebraska Republicans
People from Cherry County, Nebraska
People from Nevada, Missouri
Ranchers from Nebraska
Republican Party United States senators from Nebraska
Women in Nebraska politics
20th-century American politicians
20th-century American women politicians